Bushra (بشرى) is an Arabic feminine given name meaning "good news", "omen", or "perfect". Variants include alternatively spelled as Boshra, and the Turkish Büşra, which was among the top five names given to girls born in Turkey in the last decade. This name is also given to girls in Jordan, Egypt,.

People

Bushra
Bushra (Egyptian actress), an Egyptian actress
Bushra al-Assad (born 1960), first child and only daughter of Hafez al-Assad, former president of Syria
Bushra Ansari, Pakistani actress, comedian, singer and playwright
Bushra Bibi, Pakistani spiritualist, homemaker and the third spouse of the Prime Minister of Pakistan Imran Khan
Bushra Anjum Butt (born 1981), Pakistani politician, member of the Provincial Assembly of the Punjab
Bushra Farrukh (born 1957), Pakistani poet
Bushra Gohar, Pakistani politician and Pashtun human rights activist
Bushra Hyder, Pakistani schoolteacher and peace activist
Bushra Junaid, Canadian artist, curator and arts administrator
Bushra Khalil, Lebanese lawyer
Bushra Massouh, Syrian politician
Bushra Mateen (born 1943), Pakistani educator
Bushra Rahman, Pakistani politician who served as member of the National Assembly of Pakistan
Bushra Rind, Pakistani politician, member of the Provincial Assembly of Balochistan
Bushra al-Thamali, Abbasid military commander and governor (wali or amir) of Tarsus and the borderlands with the Byzantine Empire in Cilicia
Bushra Begum, A teacher, worker and a home-maker.

Büşra
 Büşra Ahlatcı (born 1994), Turkish footballer
 Büşra Cansu (born 1990), Turkish volleyballer
 Büşra Develi (born 1993), Turkish actor
 Büşra Katipoğlu (born 1992), Turkish judoka
 Büşra Kılıçlı (born 1990), Turkish volleyball player
 Büşra Kuru (born 2001), German-born Turkish footballer
 Büşra Mutay (born 1990), Turkish track and field athlete competing in long jump and triple jump
 Büşra Nur Tırıklı (born 1994), Turkish Paralympian discus thrower
 Büşra Pekin (born 1982), Turkish actress
 Büşra Ün (born 1994), Turkish Paralympian wheelchair tennis player
 Büşra Yalçınkaya (born 1996), Turkish female badminton player

Boshra 

 Boshra Al-Shaeby (born 1995), Jordanian chess player
 Boshra Dastournezhad (born 1985), Iranian-born model, and actress on stage and film.
 Boshra Salem, professor, scholar of land degradation and desertification, founder and the Chair of the Department of Environmental Sciences at Alexandria University

Fiction
 Bushra Abbasi, a fictional character in EastEnders

See also
Bushra (Jordan), also known as (Bishra), town in the governorate of Irbid, Jordan

Notes

Arabic feminine given names
Pakistani feminine given names